Hans Luedtke was a German inventor in the field of music.

Biography 
Organist, musicologist and inventor Hans Luedtke developed special Oskalyd extended organs and keyboards that could be used with any desired tone system. Rounded edge hexagonal shaped keys were to be arranged like honeycombs in such a way that intervals would be represented by unique vectors (i.e. a Generalized keyboard). He mentioned tunings with semi-, third-, and quartertones, methods for playing special glissandos, electronic switching between tunings or registers during performances, and he also outlined a notation system analogous to the keyboards and a direct opto-electric recording system.

Patents 
 DE 388,209. Walcker-Luedtke-Hammer Oskalyd Orgelbau. Vorrichtung zum Erhoehen der Klangwirkung von Tasteninstrumenten, Orgeln u. dgl. 1924.01.19
 DE 403,152. Walcker-Luedtke-Hammer Oskalyd Orgelbau. Tasteninstrument, Orgel o. dgl. (GB 218,252, CH 108,096, DK 34,686) 1924.10.09
DE 630,202. H. Luedtke. Orgelartiges Musikinstrument. (US 1,919,849, GB 390,574) 1936.05.27
DE 604,495. H. Luedtke. Tastatur fuer Zwecke der Klangausloesung, der Klangaufzeichnung und fuer Registrierzwecke, insbesondere bei orgelartigen Instrumenten. (US 2,003,894, GB 413,483, FR 756,638) 1934.10.23	
DE 630,202 H. Luedtke. Orgelartiges Musikinstrument. (US 1,919,849, GB 390,574) 1936.05.27	
DE 639,272 H. Luedtke. Ausbildung eines Tastenfeldes, insbesondere fuer Musikinstrumente. (US 2,061,364, GB 459,900)1936.12.02
DE 749,198 P. H. Luedtke. Tastatur fuer Handharmoniken. 1944.11.17

Writing 
Viol-Chaconne (J. S. Bach) organ transcription, 1916
"Seb. Bachs Choralvorspiele." (1918) BachJb xv, 1-96.
"Zur Entstehung des Orgelbüchleins (1717)." (1919) BachJb xvi, 62-66
"Das Oskalyd" (1926) Musik und Maschine 8-9, 385-387
"Portativ-Positiv-Kleinorgel nach Changie-Prinzip" (1938) 'DIBZ' 39 p. 117 (ref. www.portativo.it - Studi e richerche sull'organo portativo)

See also 
Prepared Piano
Turkish music (style)
Microtonal music

Notes 
  Unusual sounds coming from Oskalyd op. 2113 installed in 1926 at Odessa, Ukraine: Große Trommel, Kleine Trommel, Gong, Tamburin, Holzblock, Retgen, große Kirchenglocke, kleine Kirchenglocke, brechendes Glas, Schlittenglöckchen, Turmuhr, Lokomotivenpfeife, Donner, Vogel 1, Vogel 2, Kuckuck, Telephon, Automobil, Jazz (ref. orgelforum post 8868)

Bibliography 
An Elementary Treatise on Musical Intervals and Temperament. Robert Holford Macdowall Bosanquet. MacMillan & Co., London, 1876.
"The Bosanquetian 7-rank keyboard after Poole and Brown." Erv Wilson. Xenharmonikôn Volume 1 (Spring 1974)
"The Generalized Keyboard Scalatron." George Secor. Xenharmonikôn Volume 3 (Spring 1975)
"History and Principles of Microtonal keyboard Design." Douglas Keislar. CCRMA Stanford Univ. Dept. Music, Rep. Nr. STAN-M-45. 04.1988

External links 
Walcker Orgelbau
Kino-orgeln Karl Heinz Dettke, 1998
Contraption_IPP_71512 Trimpin
NMM 3587 Grand piano with Turkish music by Anton Martin Thÿm, Vienna, ca. 1815, National Music Museum
arcana & incunabula Brian Mclaren. tuning digest post
The Clavette Harold Fortuin
The Basics of Generalized Keyboards Graham Breed
The general keyboard in the age of MIDI John S. Allen
Wilson Archives Kraig Grady

20th-century German inventors
Microtonal musicians